Until 1689, mutiny was regulated in England by Articles of War instituted by the monarch and effective only in a period of war. This abuse of the crown's prerogative (the crown's right to make and enforce rules for the military) caused Parliament to pass the Petition of Right in 1628. This Act stated that neither civilians nor soldiers and officers who were in England during peace were subject to military courts or law. Only common-law courts and courts of equity could exercise authority over individuals in peacetime England. Because the articles of war did not fall under these court's jurisdiction, military law could not be applied to anyone in England, whether soldier or civilian.

In 1689, the first Mutiny Act was passed which passed the responsibility to enforce discipline within the military to Parliament. The Mutiny Act, altered in 1803, and the Articles of War defined the nature and punishment of mutiny until the latter were replaced by the Army Discipline and Regulation Act in 1879. This, in turn, was replaced by An Act to consolidate the Army Discipline and Regulation Act, 1879, and the subsequent Acts amending the Same, to be known as the Army Act in 1881.

The Army Act 1881 applied to members of the regular British Army, whether during wartime or peace. Although the traditional reserve military forces (not to be confused with the newer British Army reserves made up of regular soldiers who remained liable for recall after completing their full-time engagements) of the Militia, Yeomanry, and Volunteer Force were increasingly integrated with the British Army during the latter decades of the nineteenth century, as with the previous Mutiny Acts, the members of these units were not subject to the Army Act unless embodied for active service or for training with the regular army. This remained the case with the Territorial Force (created by the amalgamation of the Yeomanry and the Volunteer Force under the Territorial and Reserve Forces Act 1907) and the Territorial Army as the Territorial Force was renamed by the Territorial Army and Militia Act 1921.

As specified in the Army Act 1955, in reference to the Act's application to reservists, pensioners, and members of the Territorial Army:

A number of regiments of the British Army, most of which are reserve units on Territorial Army lines, based and recruited in British Overseas Territories, although technically falling under the remit and control of the British Government (as national government, whereas the territorial government is strictly a local government to which most areas of internal government have been delegated) exist under acts of local legislatures, requiring clauses of those acts to also apply the Army Act to these units. These units, as of 2020, include the Royal Bermuda Regiment (RBR), the Royal Gibraltar Regiment, the Falkland Islands Defence Force (FIDF), the Royal Montserrat Defence Force, with the Cayman Islands Regiment and the Turks and Caicos Regiment being in the process of formation. With the exceptions of the Royal Bermuda Regiment and the Royal Gibraltar Regiment, these units have been defined by the British Government as auxiliary to the British Army, making them British military units, but not acknowledged as parts of the British Army.

The Parliament of Bermuda's Defence Act, 1965, which legislated the amalgamation of the Bermuda Militia Artillery and the Bermuda Rifles to form the Royal Bermuda Regiment (at the time, the Bermuda Regiment) in 1965, specifies when the Army Act applies to personnel of the regiment:

The Army Act 1881 was renewed by Parliament annually, unless both Houses of Parliament approved a  draft Order in Council continuing its life, with amendments or consolidations as required. The UK Parliamentary website lists:

 Army Act 1881
 Army Act 1882
 Army Act 1911
 Army Act 1914
 Army Act 1916
 Army Act 1926
 Army Act 1938
 Army Act 1953
 Army Act 1955
 Army Act 1957
 Army Act 1958
 Army Act 1961
 Army Act 1965
 Army Act 1992
 Army Act 1995

References 

United Kingdom Acts of Parliament 1881
United Kingdom Acts of Parliament 1882
United Kingdom Acts of Parliament 1911
United Kingdom Acts of Parliament 1914
United Kingdom Acts of Parliament 1916
United Kingdom Acts of Parliament 1926
United Kingdom Acts of Parliament 1938
United Kingdom Acts of Parliament 1953
United Kingdom Acts of Parliament 1955
United Kingdom Acts of Parliament 1957
United Kingdom Acts of Parliament 1958
United Kingdom Acts of Parliament 1961
United Kingdom Acts of Parliament 1965
United Kingdom Acts of Parliament 1992
United Kingdom Acts of Parliament 1995